The 5th Ing Cup began on 20 April 2004 and concluded on 5 March 2005. Chang Hao defeated Choi Cheol-han 3–1 in the finals.

The main tournament featured 24 players:
China (8): Chang Hao, Gu Li, Kong Jie, Liu Xing, Ma Xiaochun, Peng Quan, Yu Bin, Zhou Heyang
Japan (7): Hane Naoki, O Meien, O Rissei, Otake Hideo, Rin Kaiho, Yamashita Keigo, Yoda Norimoto
Korea (5): Choi Cheol-han, Lee Chang-ho, Lee Sedol, Song Tae Kon, Yoo Changhyuk
Taiwan (2): Cho U, Zhou Junxun
North America (1): Jimmy Cha
Europe (1): Alexandre Dinerchtein

Lee Chang-ho, Ma Xiaochun, Otake Hideo, Yoda Norimoto, Chang Hao, Rin Kaiho, O Meien, and Yu Bin were given first round byes.

Tournament

Finals

References

Ing Cup
2004 in go
2005 in go